Napoleonic tactics describe certain battlefield principles used by national armies from the late 18th century until the invention and adoption of the rifled musket in the mid 19th century. Napoleonic tactics are characterized by intense drilling of the soldiers; speedy battlefield movement; combined arms assaults between infantry, cavalry, and artillery; and a relatively small numbers of cannon, short-range musket fire, and bayonet charges.  Napoleon I is considered by military historians to have been a master of this particular form of warfare.  Napoleonic tactics continued to be used after they had become technologically impractical, leading to large-scale slaughters during the American Civil War, Austro-Prussian War and the Franco-Prussian War.

Infantry tactics
Infantry formed the base of Napoleonic tactics as they were the largest force in all of the major battles of eighteenth and nineteenth century Europe.  Many Napoleonic tactics base their origin from Ancien Régime royalist strategists like Jean-Baptiste Vaquette de Gribeauval; Jean-Pierre du Teil; Jacques Antoine Hippolyte, Comte de Guibert and Pierre-Joseph Bourcet.  They emphasized the "flexible use of artillery" and  they "abandoned marching in lines (which maximized a unit's firepower) in favour of attacking in columns."

Infantry used the smoothbore, flintlock musket, the standard weapon of the Napoleonic Era, which had scarcely changed since John Churchill, 1st Duke of Marlborough directed British troops at the Battle of Blenheim in 1704. A highly trained soldier could fire once about every 15–20 seconds until black powder fouled and the weapon had to be cleaned before firing again.

Many soldiers on Napoleonic battlefields were coerced into staying in battle.  To overcome their individual inclination to self-preservation and to provide effective firepower, the infantry regiments fought shoulder-to-shoulder, at least two or three lines deep, firing in volleys.  The officers and non-commissioned officers carried swords and halberds which could be used to keep the infantrymen in the firing line.  Should a soldier shirk duty and flee from the field of battle, each army normally had a picket line of cavalry at its rear encouraging the soldier to return to their regiment.  To assist with command and control of the infantry, each soldier would wear a colorful military uniform visible from a distance, even through the black-powder clouds hovering over the Napoleonic battlefields.  Napoleon himself did not underestimate the importance of morale and said once that, "Moral force rather than numbers decides victory."

Infantry in the battlefield

Most Napoleonic battles took place on farm fields, villages, roads, and streams; French forces regarded cities, mountains, swamps, and heavy woods as unsuitable combat arenas.  Generals, such as the Duke of Wellington at the Battle of Waterloo, sought out terrain suitable for their forces.  Infantry regiments use three primary battle formations: column formation, line formation, and infantry square (square formation).

The first formation, known as column formation because of its narrow and long form, suited soldiers marching down a road or moving quickly towards the enemy across an open field.  Because the column formation was a large target for muskets and cannon, regiments would normally change formation as the enemy drew closer.

The second formation, known as a line formation, made up of two or three solid lines of infantry, helped present as many muskets as possible allowing the unit to control a wider portion of the battlefield than a column and maximizing the firepower of the unit.  The long lines proved difficult to sustain because of the need to remain solid over long distances and from disruptions like ditches, fences, and trees on the battlefield.  The line formation also fell prey to cavalry charges since the horses could cover the final  while only receiving a single volley of fire from the infantry.

The third formation, known as infantry square, used 4-6 ranks in depth with a square or rectangular shape to protect infantry from cavalry charges with the goal of not presenting the rear or sides of the soldiers to cavalry. The square consisted of fairly short columns in a square-like formation with generally 1 to 2 rows of men on each side with fixed bayonets and muskets pointed outward. The exposure of the bayonets would prevent head on charges of cavalry into the squares and thus were quite effective. The unit could move in square, but the square model proved slower than a column and more vulnerable to musket and cannon fire, so if enemy infantry were a more proximate threat than cavalry, the unit would shift from square to line formation. 

A fourth formation, considered a specialty of the French Army, was l'ordre mixte, a mix of line and column used for pressing an attack against enemy infantry.  It had some of the "weight" of the column formation for pushing through an opposing line, but some companies in line formation to offset some of the column formation's vulnerability to fire. However this was rarely used, as it was thought of as an  unnecessary compromise, as line formation or square formation often had better results.

The light infantry, normally composed of men less than 5 feet, 6 inches in height, would precede their regiment as it approached an enemy unit. Their duty was to harass the enemy with scattered musket fire and to try to force back the enemy's skirmishers attempting to do the same. The light infantry fought as skirmishers, rather than shoulder-to-shoulder, taking advantage of the room between soldiers and all bits of cover to move towards the enemy while firing and reloading. Eventually, the line infantry and grenadier companies of the regiment would overtake the light infantry which would then resume its  place in the regimental firing line. The initial volley was very important as it was the one offering the most visibility and best chance of hitting the enemy. The shock troops of the regiment were the grenadiers, typically men at least 6 feet in height, normally wearing tall headgear such as a bearskin to enhance the effect. They often led a charge or a counter-charge when the fighting was at its most desperate. After some volleys were exchanged, officers would then use their judgement to determine the best time to charge the enemy with the fixed bayonet. After the thunder and casualties of close-range musket fire, the sight of a well-formed infantry unit approaching with bayonets fixed was often too much and a unit would flee the battlefield. As a result of this fear, inspired by the shining metal of the bayonet, a bayonet charge rarely ever caught much other than the bravest enemy infantry, before the remaining opposition either flees or routs.

Cavalry tactics
In this era of warfare, cavalry units had many responsibilities on the battlefield.  As they were mounted on horses, they were the fastest-moving forces.  They would perform "screening" duties which consisted of identifying the size, strength, and location of enemy forces while trying to prevent the enemy from doing the same.

Cavalry also provided the shock element on the Napoleonic era battlefield, much like a tank in the 20th and 21st centuries.  The short effective range, long reload times, and rapid fouling of the smoothbore musket meant that cavalry units could quickly close in on infantry units before the horsemen could be overwhelmed with musket fire.  Cavalry units were also responsible for fixing enemy forces in place, typically by charging at infantry units which would respond by forming into semi-static "squares".  If the infantry unit failed to form square, quite often they would be overrun by the charging cavalry and forced to flee the battlefield en masse.  Cavalry units often fought against other cavalry units to essentially neutralize one another.  The speed of cavalry units made them capable of surprising enemy forces, especially as these battlefields were often covered in thick smoke generated by the black-powder muskets, cannon, and howitzer.  Cavalry units also protected generals and marshals since these officers were usually mounted and were likely to move too quickly on the battlefield to be protected by infantry.

Cavalry on the battlefield
Cavalry units required a great deal of logistical support as the horses consumed much forage and would tire quickly galloping in combat.  They also were ill-suited for holding terrain as the troopers' smoothbore carbines were very short-ranged and the troopers were primarily trained to fight on horseback.  Some of the dragoon units fought on foot however they used horseback to move around.  Cavalry units were vulnerable to artillery fire as the horses were large targets.  Typically when cavalry units would charge artillery, they would suffer many casualties while inflicting few on the artillery in return.  The artillery crews would ordinarily fire until the horsemen were nearby and then retreat to the safety of a friendly infantry unit in square.  At this point, cavalry were trained to bring along headless nails to "spike" the guns by hammering these nails into the touchhole near the breech of the cannon, thereby rendering it useless on the battlefield.

Artillery tactics
The Napoleonic era saw many developments in field artillery. Field artillery (also known as light artillery) is a class of mobile artillery that backs up armies on the battlefield. These guns were developed with an emphasis towards maneuverability, mobility, accuracy over long distance, and speed.  Mobile artillery advancements date back to Gustavus Adolphus of Sweden in the Thirty Years' War (1618–48). Adolphus is recognized as being the first military commander to mass his light artillery units into batteries and to employ them in combination with other arms. By the mid eighteenth century, commanders from various nations had arrived to the conclusion that mobile artillery that could accompany the rest of the army was a necessity that one could not afford to be without. No longer would artillery's influence be limited to that which was within its firing range. Field artillery would instead become a key component in shifting the tides on the battlefield. After the reorganization of the army into corps, the French army established semi-autonomous artillery formations that were led and coordinated by artillery officers. These formations were successful in demonstrating the potential tactical and offensive power of field artillery out on the battlefield. 
During the Napoleonic period, field artillery consisted of foot artillery, horse artillery, and mountain artillery.

Artillery in the battlefield
Artillery was the most devastating weapon on the field during the Napoleonic era, and its use could leave the enemy troops demoralized. Solid metal cannonball (also known as a "round shot") were commonly used artillery ammunition. They were effective against square formations and heavily packed columns when fired almost parallel to the ground for they would "bounce" into enemy forces with gruesome results. Essentially, the round shot would bounce a few times and start to roll, ripping through anything in its wake. Taking this into consideration, artillery crews often sought out hard, flat, and open terrain. At extremely close range, artillery could use canister shot, large tin cans holding a large number of small bullets. Another variation of this was scattershot, a canister or heavy cloth bag filled with nails and other scrap iron. Basically, the firing of canisters was the equivalent of using a giant shotgun to disintegrate incoming troops. Yet another variation was grapeshot, a heavy cloth bag packed well with larger ammunition, which got its name from its appearance as being a bundle of grapes. Napoleon employed a variation of this tactic to crush the Vendémiaire uprising.  Besides cannons, artillery was made up of howitzers and other type of guns that used ammunition that packed an explosive punch (also known as "explosive shells"). Explosive shells had a reputation of being unreliable since they would often explode either too early or not at all. However, in the cases in which the shell exploded on the target, the results were devastating, especially towards cavalry units.

References

External links
 Infantry Tactics During the Napoleonic wars – Musketry

Military tactics
La Grande Armée